Valerij Verhušin (born 10 March 1960) is a Russian naturalized Macedonian wrestler. He competed in the men's freestyle 74 kg at the 1996 Summer Olympics.

References

External links
 

1960 births
Living people
Macedonian male sport wrestlers
Olympic wrestlers of North Macedonia
Wrestlers at the 1996 Summer Olympics
Place of birth missing (living people)